Agrenev (masculine) or Agreneva (feminine) is a Russian last name. It derives from either the first name Agrikola (Latin for farmer) or Agrippa (after the Roman gens).

The following people shared this last name:
Dmitry Agrenev-Slavyansky; see music of Azerbaijan

References

Notes

Sources
Ю. А. Федосюк (Yu. A. Fedosyuk). "Русские фамилии: популярный этимологический словарь" (Russian Last Names: a Popular Etymological Dictionary). Москва, 2006. 

Russian-language surnames
